Vlădaia is a commune located in Mehedinți County, Oltenia, Romania. It is composed of four villages: Almăjel, Scorila, Ștircovița and Vlădaia.

References

Communes in Mehedinți County
Localities in Oltenia